Equador (lit. "Equator") is the southernmost city in the Brazilian state of Rio Grande do Norte. It is known as the 'City of Sun' by Brazilians.

References 

Municipalities in Rio Grande do Norte